Opatov is a municipality and village in Svitavy District in the Pardubice Region of the Czech Republic. It has about 1,200 inhabitants.

Economy
Opatov is known for the Opatov Photovoltaics Plant.

Twin towns – sister cities

Opatov is twinned with:
 Drezzo (Colverde), Italy

References

Villages in Svitavy District